The 1902 Army Cadets football team represented the United States Military Academy in the 1902 college football season. The Cadets also defeated Syracuse by a 46 to 0 score and tied with an undefeated Yale team that has been recognized as a national co-champion. In the annual Army–Navy Game at Franklin Field in Philadelphia, the Cadets defeated the Midshipmen 

Two members of this team were inducted into the College Football Hall of Fame: quarterback Charles Dudley Daly and tackle Paul Bunker.  In addition, five members of the squad were honored by one or both of Walter Camp (WC) and Caspar Whitney (CW) on the All-America team. They are: Bunker (WC-1, CW-1); Daly (WC-3); center Robert Boyers (WC-2, CW-1); tackle Edward Farnsworth (CW-2); and fullback Henry Torney (WC-3).

Schedule

Personnel
HB Paul Bunker

References

Army
Army Black Knights football seasons
Army Cadets football